The Roloway monkey (Cercopithecus roloway) is an endangered species of Old World monkey endemic to tropical West Africa. It was previously considered a subspecies of the Diana monkey (C. diana). The species is classified as Critically Endangered due to habitat loss and their continued hunting because of the bushmeat trade. The Roloway monkey is mainly an arboreal species, for the most part inhabiting forests in Ghana and some reserves in South-Eastern Côte-D'Ivoire. More specifically, studies have shown that C. roloway is primarily concentrated in the Tanoé forest of the Côte-D'Ivoire because of their heavy threats to extinction and lack of habitat. It is still difficult to gather data on wild subjects, as they have low populations in a vast forest, but they are a unique and vanishing species.

Taxonomy 

Both the Cercopithecus diana and the Cercopithecus roloway were originally categorized under the well-known species group: diana. This categorization meant that the two monkeys were related subspecies. This classification, related species from one another, changed in 2005, when each monkey was to be considered its own species, and treated as such. This differing classification is beneficial to each species in relation to conservation efforts and justifications for necessity of conservation.  It can be challenging to find funding for extreme conservation efforts, and when the Cercopithecus diana and the Cercopithecus roloway were considered related subspecies, the urgency for conservation may not have been as great. Individuals can find themselves more willing to support conservation of a unique species rather than a subspecies.

Description 

The Roloway monkey is a species of guenon monkeys. In fact, they are the largest of all of the 26 African Cercopithecus. Of this genus, The roloway monkey is most similar to the C. diana. Both of these monkeys share similar physical features as well. They both have dark fur surrounding a majority of their body, with a dark brown-reddish patch on their lower back. The Roloway monkey has a prominent white beard resting under its black chin, and above its dark eyes is a horizontal white stripe of fur, resting directly on its brow bone.

Its face is a dark black, accentuated by the bright white fur covering its shoulders and chest. Roloway Monkeys have a relatively flat skull, and unlike many other primates, they do not have an elongated chin cavity, also referred to as a rostrum. In addition, the nostrils of the monkey are closely set and they angle downwards. Its chest, and throat are bright white, and the monkey has white line of fur that runs along each outer-thigh. On the inside of the thighs, the fur can range from being white, red, brown, or even yellowish. They have exceptionally long tails, longer than the entirety of their body. There are not many body measurements of adult Roloway monkeys, but through analysis and comparison with the Diana species, it is estimated that the Roloway Monkeys body length ranges from 40 cm to 55 cm, and the tails of the monkey range from 50 cm to 75 cm long.

Male monkeys weigh about 5 kg, or 11 pounds. The female Roloway weigh only about 2.5 kg, or 5.5 pounds. The Roloway monkey has a distinct cheek pouch, something that it shares with all cercopithecus monkeys. This patch allows the monkeys to store food such as fruits, nuts and seeds, which are the majority of their diet as they are omnivorous primates. Cercopithecinae monkeys all have opposable thumbs, which are quite well-developed; the Roloway Monkey also has fingernails on all of their fingers. Finally, the Roloway monkey has a long lifespan, similar to that of other primates, ranging from 20 to 30 years.

Distribution and habitat 

The species occurs in a small area of eastern Ivory Coast and the forests of Ghana, between the Sassandra and Pra Rivers, and  may possibly occur in Burkina Faso and Togo. The Roloway inhabit the canopy of old-growth forests, including gallery forests, in moist-low-lying regions, and avoids but can make use of forests that have been lightly logged. The Roloway monkey cannot live in areas where humans have had a large impact, therefore they only live in secluded, primary forests. Primary forests are ones that have not been majorly affected, and they are quite old and full of unique attributions that can allow for populations of animals and plants to be more stable in the long term. These forests are very lush, containing thick and moist shrubbery that allows for easy hiding. The habitats of the Roloway are very complex, and the terrain is not simple, meaning they have many places to hide and escape view. Small areas of these forests and habitats are used to inhabit the monkeys, and the group sizes of the species tend to be minuscule. The monkeys' instinct to flee combined with the areas they choose to live in, make it very hard to study them or gather any new information on the changes in their population size or behavior. Even when studies were performed where scientists stayed in the area where the monkeys were typically found, the Roloway monkey was only spotted on one occasion. In addition to this, most of the Roloway monkey found are taken to zoos to be kept and observed. This is because their population is so low and there are so few seen in the wild, so the main conservation effort is capturing these animals. In addition, the Roloway is unable to survive in a natural, wild, area that has been largely impacted by humans.

Ecology

Diet 

The Roloway monkey is an omnivorous species, meaning they will feed on both plants and animals. This means the primates consume various fruits, flowers, leaves, and even insects. Because insects are included in their primary nutritional consumption, the Roloway can be described as insectivorous, along with being labeled an omnivore. The primates will search for large invertebrates and eat them for sustenance. In addition, the Roloway monkey will consume larvae and eggs of said invertebrates for added nutritional value. They can feed on the plant parts of roughly 130 species of trees, climbers, and epiphytes. Like many omnivores, the Roloway monkey also consumes mature fruit pulp, arthropods, oil-rich seeds, and young leaves.

The diet of the Roloway monkey is one that has been observed for quite some time. It is presumed that the monkey will vary its diet in accordance to the season of the year. This means that the Roloway will eat more fruit, and pulp during the dry season of the year. During the wet season, when more insects are out and available for hunting, the Roloway will consume less fruit and seed, and will act more on its insectivorous urges. The variation in abundance of their food supply is the primary influences of such diet changes, and it is actually quite beneficial for the Roloway to sustain itself of varying food sources. When hunting for their food, the Roloway monkey will look for the most direct path, and may not choose to swing, climb, or jump from branch to branch if it is not the most efficient means of food collection.

Predation 

The Roloway monkey does not often employ its "fight" instinct, rather it chooses to flee from danger. Typical predators of the Roloway monkey include the leopard, large prey birds, chimpanzees, and other larger species. In order to survive against these predators, the Roloway will use communication techniques such as warning sounds, or even signals, in order to tell the other members of their group that a threat is near, and they must flee to safety. The predators do have an impact on the population of monkeys, but they are not the primary cause for the decline in overall population, and the reason for the critically endangered title the Roloway has been given.

Behaviour 

Roloway monkeys typically are diurnally active only, and spend the night sleeping high in the canopy, similar to other primates and mammals. The species forms social groups of around 6-30 individuals, typically with a single male, around 10 females and their offspring. Males may change between groups, while females generally stay with the same group into which they were born. When there are reduced populations of the Roloway, the habits of staying in the same group can impose restrictions on the ability for the species to recuperate. For the monkeys, most of their day is spent searching for food, and in between hunting, during rest time, the monkeys will take time to groom one another, play, and care for their young. This is the primary time for bonds to form and strengthen. The rest period during the day is also a great time for the infants to learn and grow mentally. In addition, the Roloway monkey is social, and will interact with other monkeys that inhabit the same areas. The younger, more juvenile Roloway will not be as outgoing and strong as the adult Roloway. The juvenile will also have more reliance on the adults for learning, and understanding of their surroundings. There is still little known about the species day to day activity, as their population numbers are so low and there is not much scientific research on the roloway.

Communication 

It is known that many primates have very advanced methods of communicating to one another. The Roloway monkey is no exception, as it has many different types of calls and sounds it will make based on the scenario. The monkey is known to croak, chuckle, shriek, and will even make distinct yelling sounds when it senses a threat, and wants to warn the others in the group. Another frequent call is one that the males of the haram will make. This is known as a gathering call and it lets the females and juveniles of the group know that they should return to their home range, near the male. Verbal communications are not the only forms of communication the Roloway employs. Many individuals will perform physical communications, including facial expressions, posture, hand signals, and even actions. The eyebrows of the monkey can also be a giveaway for the emotion it is trying to portray. Raised eyebrows can be used to show threatening signals. In addition, their eyes are important, as a Roloway that is staring is one that is showing dominance and threats. Finally, they use their mouth and teeth as a way of being either dominant or submissive, and different mouth movements or shapes can mean different things. When showing teeth in a smile, the monkey is usually submissive, but when growling and wide open, with a pushed out jaw, the monkey is aggressing. Within their groups, there are levels of hierarchy, and distinct communication, both physical and verbal, is needed in order to maintain a peaceful structure, and to reduce tension and fighting. This is where grooming becomes so essential, as it allows for stronger bonds and sharing of information to occur.

Reproduction 

Much of the information about reproduction for the Roloway monkey is based on knowledge of the closely-related Diana monkey. While they are different species, their reproductive behavior is very similar. The Roloway monkey is polygynous, meaning that one male who acts as a leader in the group. Females go through an Estrous cycle of 30 days, and this cycle can occur at any point in the year. This means that there is not one specific time for breeding, but the male can mate with a female whenever her estrous occurs. Female Roloways normally give birth to a single infant or, rarely, twins, after a gestation period of around six months. The female monkey is the primary caretaker, though siblings or non-related female monkeys may help to care for the newborn. The mother will suckle the infant for about six months, and then it will feed it a more adult-like diet, including fruit, nuts, and seeds.  A Roloway monkey reaches maturity at about 3–4 years of age. A young male typically seeks out a new group that he can join or forms a new group in order to reproduce with unrelated females. The lifespan of a Roloway monkey is about 20 years in the wild, while individuals in captivity may live for more than 30 years. Captive Roloway monkeys typically go through hormonal changes that restrict their ability to effectively mate and reproduce, but if the conditions match that of their home habitats, they can reproduce as they would in the wild.

Conservation

Threats 

The Roloway monkey is a very threatened species, being labeled as an endangered species by the IUCN in 2008. As the population of the monkeys continued to rapidly decline, and the hunting and habitat loss continued, the species was moved up to critically endangered, meaning conservation is more needed than ever. In addition to this title by the IUCN, the Roloway monkey is one of the top three most threatened monkeys on the west coast of Africa. Other sources have suspected that the Roloway is in fact the top most threatened primate in the entire continent of Africa.

The Roloway require a habitat of a primary forest, also known as an old-growth forest, in order to survive. The issue with this is that such forests are undergoing rapid levels of deforestation for human purposes, and this is causing exceptional levels of habitat loss for so many species, including the Roloway. Ghana, the country that the Roloway have been most frequently spotted, has gone through a drastic loss of close to 90% of its forest land throughout the past 100 years. The reason this loss in habitat is so profound is because the Roloway monkey is not good at adapting to new areas or habitats. It requires very specific characteristics in its environment, and as the monkey started to lose such environment, its population has fallen tremendously.  The species is listed as one of "The World's 25 Most Endangered Primates". In fact, it is estimated that there are only around 2,000 living individuals, and their population will continue to decline because of how highly hunters value their quality meat. Roloway monkeys are on the brink of extinction not only because of hunting but because of human expansion. The once expansive forest they inhabited continues to shrink as roadways and transportations areas expand. In addition, much of the forest is being used for farming purposes, making the land inhabitable for the monkey. There are fewer and fewer sightings every year since the 1970s and, recently, many of the areas that the Roloway could be found have recently reported zero sightings.

Not only are their predators such as the chimpanzee, the leopard, and the crowned eagle very dangerous, but the Roloway Monkey is also largely affected by humans. The Roloway monkey is a primary target in Ghana bushmeat trade. The bushmeat trade is massive, accumulating almost 1,000 tons of meat, and selling it in the markets on Ghana's streets. The reason the Roloway monkey is so popular for bushmeat is because they are unique. Also, the monkey tends to make loud noises when communicating, and this can allow for hunters to find their location more easily, thus leading the monkeys to being hunted. Recently, however, it has been found that there are so few Roloway left, that even hunters do not want to seek out the monkeys, as they might not make as much profit because of the time it would take to find one. Not only is hunting an issue, but so is habitat loss. Humans are expanding rapidly, and to get more land for buildings, crops, and other human necessities, people are cutting down areas of the forest that the Roloway tend to inhabit. With less and less area to live in, the monkeys become more threatened by hunting, and they also cannot expand their population as much. Humans are the primary reason for such a low population size because of hunting, increased infrastructure, habitat destruction and habitat fragmentation.

Conservation efforts 

The Roloway monkey is now considered one of the top 25 most critically threatened primates in the entire world. There are conservation efforts that need to be taken immediately in order to save this species. There is great recognition for how threatened the species is, but there is not a lot of action going on. CITES labeled them as a Class A species of the African Convention of Nature and Natural Resources, but there are quite a few issues with policy making in the countries that the Roloway live. Due to these issues, there are not many laws properly enforced against the poaching of this species. There are some small foundations started in areas surrounding the Tanoe forest and other locations the monkeys have been found, but without government help, the organizations probably will not go far. Large conservation programs are trying to aid in the revival of this species, through captive breeding and other methods. Unfortunately, the species has hit a point where this breeding is not extremely successful, as the monkeys do not have anywhere to be released to. Currently, efforts need to be in place to find a new location that the primates could thrive in after breeding programs have allowed for a larger captive population that have the potential to be released In 2020, however, the United Kingdom had a large celebration for the first ever birth of a Roloway monkey in that country. There are current breeding programs all over the world, and while many have not been largely successful, this is a small win. The reason breeding programs have had struggles is because the monkeys can have a difficult time acclimating to one another, and are not entirely willing to breed. There are also so few in captivity, that the breeding is quite selective, as inbreeding depression is unfavorable and could worsen the conservation status of the species.

References

External links

Roloway monkey
Primates of Africa
Mammals of West Africa
Roloway monkey
Roloway monkey
Species endangered by habitat loss
Species endangered by use as food
Taxa named by Johann Christian Daniel von Schreber